Tyko Henrik Reinikka (10 December 1887 – 18 January 1964) was a Finnish bank director and politician. He served as Minister of Trade and Industry from 31 December 1925 to 13 December 1926, Minister of Finance from 18 August 1929 to 4 July 1930, as Deputy Minister of Finance from 6 March to 7 October 1936 and again from 5 March 1943 to 8 August 1944. He was born in Oulu, and was a member of the Parliament of Finland from 1922 to 1930, representing the Agrarian League. As one of the accused in the war-responsibility trials, he was given a prison sentence of two years on 21 February 1946 because of his political role during the Continuation War. He was pardoned by President Paasikivi on 21 October 1947.

References

1887 births
1964 deaths
People from Oulu
People from Oulu Province (Grand Duchy of Finland)
Centre Party (Finland) politicians
Ministers of Trade and Industry of Finland
Ministers of Finance of Finland
Members of the Parliament of Finland (1922–24)
Members of the Parliament of Finland (1924–27)
Members of the Parliament of Finland (1927–29)
Members of the Parliament of Finland (1929–30)
Finnish people of World War II
Finnish prisoners and detainees
Prisoners and detainees of Finland
Recipients of Finnish presidential pardons
University of Helsinki alumni